Revd Professor Elizabeth Stuart (born 1963 in Kent) is a British theologian specialising in Queer Theology.

Academic positions
Stuart is Professor of Christian Theology at the University of Winchester and was founding chair of the Centre for the Study of Christianity and Sexuality. She is the founding editor of the academic journal Theology and Sexuality. In August 2008 she took up the position of Pro Vice-Chancellor, Academic. In 2011, she became the Senior Pro Vice-Chancellor at the University of Winchester.
In 2013 she was appointed Deputy Vice-Chancellor. On 1 April 2021, Stuart became Acting Vice-Chancellor of the University of Winchester succeeding Professor Joy Carter.

Bishop
Stuart was consecrated as a bishop in the Open Episcopal Church, a small, independent grouping within the United Kingdom. In 2006 she became Archbishop of the Province of Great Britain and Ireland of the Liberal Catholic Church International. She retired in 2016 and was replaced by the Reverend Angie McLachlan.

In 2020, Stuart was ordained a priest in the Church of England.

Published writings
Stuart's published writings include:
Gay and Lesbian Theologies: Repetitions and Critical Difference 
Just Good Friends: Towards a Lesbian and Gay Theology of Relationships 
Daring to Speak Love’s Name 
Religion is a Queer Thing

These works show Stuart moving from a liberationist approach to an approach grounded in queer theory. She now argues that gender and sexuality are not matters of ultimate theological concerns and that the Christian duty is to refuse to work theologically with such categories.

Jeffrey John argued against the model proposed in Just Good Friends in his booklet Permanent, Faithful, Stable: Christian Same-Sex Partnerships.

In 2008 Stuart received the Lesbian and Gay Christian Movement Award for "energetic and prophetic advocacy on behalf of LGBT people, numerous pioneering theological books, and for remaining a loyal member of LGCM".

In 2008 the French academic Stephane Lavignotte published a book about Stuart's theology: Au-delà du lesbien et du mâle: la subversion des identités dans la théologie 'queer' d'Elizabeth Stuart (published by Van Dieren).

Personal life
Her grandfather was Ronald Niel Stuart VC.

References

External links
Stuart's staff listing on the University of Winchester website
Open Episcopal Church website
Liberal Catholic Church International website

1963 births
Living people
Academics of the University of Winchester
Old Catholic bishops
Queer theologians